Trinity Shopping Centre may refer to:

Trinity Centre, Aberdeen
Trinity Leeds